Eddie Goldman (born January 6, 1994) is  a former American football defensive tackle. He played college football at Florida State and was drafted by the Chicago Bears in the second round of the 2015 NFL Draft.

Early years
A native of Washington, D.C., he attended Friendship Collegiate Academy Public Charter School, where he played football with Yannick Ngakoue and Teez Tabor, and basketball. In high school football, he was an All-American defensive lineman. Considered a five-star recruit by ESPN and Rivals.com, Goldman was listed as the second best defensive tackle in his class, behind only Mario Edwards Jr., who later on attended Florida State with Goldman.

College career
Goldman attended Florida State University from 2012 to 2014. During his career, he had 262 tackles and six sacks. After his junior season, Goldman decided to forgo his senior year and enter the 2015 NFL Draft

Professional career

Chicago Bears

2015
Goldman was drafted 39th overall by the Chicago Bears in the 2015 NFL Draft. In his rookie year, he played fifteen games, recording 39 tackles and six tackles for a loss (TFLs), while being ranked fourth among rookies with 4.5 sacks. For his season, he was named to Mel Kiper Jr.'s All-Rookie Team and the Pro Football Writers of America's All-Rookie Team.

2016
Goldman played in six games with five starts in 2016. He suffered a high ankle sprain in Week 2 and missed the next six games. He returned in Week 10 but was bothered by the ankle injury and was placed on injured reserve on December 23, 2016.

2017
Goldman played in 15 games with 14 starts in the 2017 season. He recorded 1.5 sacks, 44 combined tackles, five quarterback hits, and one fumble recovery.

2018
On September 7, 2018, Goldman signed a four-year contract extension with the Bears worth $42 million with $25 million guaranteed. In week 14 against the Los Angeles Rams, Goldman sacked Jared Goff in the end zone for a safety. The Bears won the game 15–6. He finished the 2018 season with three sacks, 40 combined tackles, three quarterback hits, and one fumble recovery. He received an overall grade of 89.2 from Pro Football Focus in 2018, which ranked as the 12th highest grade among all qualifying interior defenders.

2019
Goldman played in 15 games with 15 starts in the 2019 season. He recorded one sack and 29 combined tackles with two tackles for loss. At the end of the season Goldman was selected as Pro Bowl alternate.

2020
On July 28, 2020, Goldman informed the Bears he would opt out of the season due to the COVID-19 pandemic. He received a $350,000 stipend for the season, and his original base salary of $4.75 million will be his salary for the following season.

2021
Goldman returned to the Bears for the 2021 season. In 14 games, he netted half a sack with 22 total tackles.

On March 14, 2022, Goldman was released by the Bears.

Atlanta Falcons 
Goldman signed with the Atlanta Falcons on July 6, 2022.

On July 19, just 13 days after signing with Atlanta, Goldman announced his retirement from the NFL.

References

External links
Florida State Seminoles bio
Chicago Bears bio
Career stats

1994 births
Living people
Players of American football from Washington, D.C.
American football defensive tackles
Florida State Seminoles football players
Chicago Bears players
Atlanta Falcons players